Protea scorzonerifolia, the channel-leaf sugarbush, is a flower-bearing shrub belonging to the genus Protea. The plant is endemic to South Africa and occurs in the Du Toit's Kloof, Franschhoek and Groot-Winterhoek mountains. The plant became extinct on the Cape Peninsula. 

References 

 http://redlist.sanbi.org/species.php?species=799-132
 http://www.biodiversityexplorer.info/plants/proteaceae/protea_scorzonerifolia.htm

scorzonerifolia